Tony Amendola (born August 24, 1951) is an American actor. He played the Jaffa master Bra'tac in Stargate SG-1 and Pinocchio's creator/father, Geppetto on ABC's Once Upon a Time. He also had a recurring role as revolutionary leader Edouard Kagame of Liber8 in the television show Continuum.

Early life
Tony Amendola was born in New Haven, Connecticut. His mother originates from the town of Amalfi in Italy. In an interview by  Blackfilm.com, he was asked, "Are you of Latino descent?" He answered, "I'm of Italian [descent], but a diaspora [that has led to] into Argentina and Mexico. My family came to the States." Tony was the first in his family to attend college and was set to become a lawyer, but his life went into a different direction and he ended up taking both pre-law courses and theater classes. After graduating from Southern Connecticut State University in 1974, he studied and earned a Master of Fine Arts Degree in 1977 at Philadelphia's Temple University. In 1978, he moved to Los Angeles to find work in film and television.

Career
Amendola is known for widely diverse roles such as the murderous drug dealer Santos Jimenez on Showtime's grisly drama Dexter, the long running role of Jaffa master Bra'tac in the science fiction series Stargate SG-1, Liber8 leader Kagame on the Syfy show Continuum, Geppetto/Marco in ABC's fantasy drama series Once Upon a Time and the Catholic priest Father Perez in the 2014 horror film Annabelle, a role he reprised for the 2019 film The Curse of La Llorona.

Amendola plays a Spanish magistrate in the 1998 swashbuckler film The Mask of Zorro and appears as a separate character in its 2005 sequel. He portrays a Mexican marijuana farmer in the 2001 crime drama film Blow. His television appearances of note include roles on The X-Files, Seinfeld, Lois & Clark: The New Adventures of Superman, Angel, Alias, The Practice, Star Trek: Voyager and She-Wolf of London.

He also has a long history of stage performances and spent his first twelve years as an actor almost exclusively in the theater. His theater credits include Othello, The Taming of the Shrew, American Buffalo, Tupolski in The Pillowman, and Shylock in The Merchant of Venice.

Amendola is the voice actor for Khadgar, one of the central characters of the video-game World of Warcraft. In 2019, he voiced Jedi researcher Eno Cordova in the video game Star Wars Jedi: Fallen Order.

Personal life
Amendola lives in Los Angeles with his wife, Judith Marx. He is fluent in Italian and Spanish.

Filmography

Films

Television

Video games

References

External links

1951 births
Living people
Male actors from New Haven, Connecticut
American people of Italian descent
20th-century American male actors
21st-century American male actors